The Tenasserim Mountain bent-toed gecko (Cyrtodactylus payarhtanensis) is a species of gecko that is endemic to the Tenasserim Hills in Myanmar.

References 

Cyrtodactylus
Reptiles described in 2017
Tenasserim Hills